The Central Statistical Administration (or Board or Directorate), abbreviated TsSU, was the main statistical organization of the former Soviet Union; it was dissolved in the 1980s, replaced by Goskomstat.

The Administration had the following names:

1918-1923 — Central Statistical Administration of the RSFSR, created by a decree of the Council of People's Commissars dated July 25, 1918
1923-1926 — Central Statistical Administration of the Council of People's Commissars of the USSR
1926-1930 — Central Statistical Administration of the USSR
1930-1931 — Economic-Statistical Sector of Gosplan
1931 — Sector of Economic Accounting of Gosplan
1931-1941 — Central Administration of Economic Accounting of Gosplan
1941-1948 — Central Statistical Administration of Gosplan
1948-1987 — Central Statistical Administration of the Council of Ministers of the USSR

References 

Government of the Soviet Union
1922 establishments in Russia
1987 disestablishments